Steven James Paulsen (born 3 September 1981) is an Australian cricketer who played for Queensland between the 2005/06 and 2011/12 seasons. He also played for Brisbane Heat franchise at the 2011–12 Big Bash League season

Steve Paulsen was a member of the Australian cricket team at the 2012 Hong Kong Cricket Sixes. He also scored an unbeaten knock of 35 runs to secure a win for Australia in the plate cup final against Netherlands at the 2012 Hong Kong Cricket Sixes.

References

External links 
 

1981 births
Living people
Australian cricketers
Queensland cricketers
Brisbane Heat cricketers
Cricketers from Queensland
Sportspeople from Ipswich, Queensland